Chiton tuberculatus, the West Indian green chiton, is a species of chiton, a marine polyplacophoran mollusk in the family Chitonidae, the typical chitons.

Description
The basic color is gray green. The valves are ribbed, dull grayish green or greenish brown, with a spicule-covered mantle girdle alternating zones of whitish, green or black.

Distribution and habitat
This species can be found under rocks and in spray zones of rocky shores, in the intertidal, shallow subtidal  zone of Western Central Atlantic (USA, Colombia, Bermuda, Mexico, Venezuela and the West Indies).

Gallery

References

External links
 Quitón (Chiton tuberculatus) - Chiton

Chitonidae
Molluscs described in 1758
Taxa named by Carl Linnaeus